Google Web Designer is a drag-and-drop page builder for Windows, Mac and Linux from Google for creating interactive HTML5 ads and other HTML5 content.   It offers a GUI with common design tools, such as a Text tool that integrates with Google Web Fonts, a Shapes tool, a Pen tool, and 3D tools. The advertising feature set includes components to add Google Maps, YouTube videos and more, as well as automatically including the tracking code events for DoubleClick and AdMob.

Google Web Designer's Code view lets the user create CSS, JavaScript, and XML files, and uses syntax highlighting and code autocompletion that makes the code easier to write with fewer errors. Google Web Designer is free to download and use.

See also
Google Sites

References

External links
Google Web Designer
Release Notes - Google Web Designer Help
TechCrunch

Web development software
2013 software
Web Designer